The Onondaga Redhawks are an American and Iroquois Senior "B" box lacrosse team from Nedrow, New York at Onondaga Nation. The team play their home games at Onondaga Nation Arena, aka Tsha'Hon'nonyen'dakhwa'.

The Redhawks are seven-time Can-Am Senior B Lacrosse League (2005, 2006, 2010, 2012, 2013, 2014, 2015) champions and the 2010 and 2014 Presidents Cup Senior B National Champions.

Junior Redhawks 
The club also fields a Junior B side, the Jr. Redhawks, who compete in the First Nations Junior B Lacrosse League.

Season-by-season results

Presidents' Cup results

Lacrosse All Stars North American Invitational results

References

External links
 Onondaga Redhawks official website
 Can-Am Lacrosse League website
 First Nations Junior Lacrosse League website

Lacrosse of the Iroquois Confederacy
Lacrosse teams in New York (state)
Lacrosse clubs established in 2001
2001 establishments in New York (state)
Sports in Onondaga County, New York